Xiao Yufeng (born 23 January 1995) is a Chinese footballer who currently plays for Wuxi Wugou in the Chinese League One.

Club career
Xiao Yufeng joined Chinese Super League side Changchun Yatai's youth academy in 2006. He moved aboard under the Chinese Football Association's 500.com Stars Project in 2011. He joined Varziml and Sacavenense's youth academy between 2011 and 2013. Xiao signed for Campeonato de Portugal side Loures in the summer of 2015. He transferred to Cova da Piedade in 2016 and was loaned to Oriental and Tourizense in the following two seasons.

Xiao returned to Changchun Yatai in February 2018. On 9 March 2018, he made his debut for the club in a 5–0 away defeat against Guangzhou Evergrande Taobao, coming on as a substitute for Sun Jie in the 82nd minute. On 29 September 2018, he scored his goal for the club in a 5–2 home defeat against Jiangsu Suning.

Career statistics
.

Honours

Club
Changchun Yatai
 China League One: 2020

References

External links
 

1997 births
Living people
Chinese footballers
People from Fushun
Footballers from Liaoning
GS Loures players
C.D. Cova da Piedade players
Clube Oriental de Lisboa players
G.D. Tourizense players
Changchun Yatai F.C. players
Segunda Divisão players
Chinese Super League players
China League One players
Association football defenders
Chinese expatriate footballers
Expatriate footballers in Portugal
Chinese expatriate sportspeople in Portugal